Gamma World is a science fantasy role-playing game, originally designed by James M. Ward and Gary Jaquet, and first published by TSR in 1978.  It borrowed heavily from Ward's earlier game, Metamorphosis Alpha.

Setting
Gamma World takes place in the mid-25th century, more than a century after a second nuclear war had destroyed human civilization. The war that destroyed civilization in Gamma World is only vaguely described in most editions of the game, and what details are provided change from version to version:
 The first two editions explained that ever-increasing material prosperity and leisure had led to ever-more radical and violent social movements, culminating in a final war in the years AD 2309–2322, and ascribe the final annihilation to a terrorist group called "The Apocalypse" and the ensuing retaliation by surviving factions.
Later versions altered the reason for the collapse.
 The 2000 Alternity version is due to alien arrival and nuclear response.
 The 2003 d20 Modern iteration is due to rampant use of nanotechnology and AI.
 The 2010 edition attributes the destruction of civilization to the activation of the Large Hadron Collider, which caused multiple realities to exchange features in an event known as "The Big Mistake".
All editions, however, agree that the cataclysm destroyed all government and society beyond a village scale, plunging the world into a Dark Age. In many editions of the game, technology is at best quasi-medieval (in the first edition, the crossbow is described as "the ultimate weapon" for most Gamma World societies). Some, such as the 2003 and, to a lesser degree the 2010 edition, feature advanced technology that is well known and often easily available. In contrast, super-science artifacts in earlier editions were risky to use due to the average Gamma World character not knowing how to properly operate such devices, or possibly even what the device is at all. The post-apocalyptic inhabitants of Earth now refer to their planet as "Gamma World" (or "Gamma Terra" in later editions).

Gamma World is a chaotic, dangerous environment that little resembles pre-apocalyptic Earth.  The weapons unleashed during the final war were strong enough to alter coastlines, level cities, and leave large areas of land lethally radioactive.  These future weapons bathed the surviving life of Earth in unspecified forms of radiation and biochemical agents, producing widespread, permanent mutations among humans, animals, and plants.  As a result, fantastic mutations such as extra limbs, super strength, and psychic powers are relatively common.  (Random tables of such improbable mutations are a hallmark of every edition of Gamma World.)  Many animals and plants are sentient, semi-civilized species competing with surviving humans.  Both humans and non-humans have lost most knowledge of the pre-war humans, whom Gamma World's inhabitants refer to as "the Ancients".  The only group with significant knowledge of the Ancients are isolated robots and other artificial intelligences that survived the war—though these machines tend to be damaged, in ill repair, or hostile to organic beings.

Gamma World player characters include unmutated humans (referred to as "Pure Strain Humans" in most editions), mutated humans, sentient animals or plants, and androids.  Characters explore Ancient ruins and strange post-apocalyptic societies to gain knowledge of the Ancients and social status for themselves.  Common adventure themes involve protecting fragile post-apocalypse societies, retrieving Ancient "artifacts" (science fiction gadgetry such as power armor, laser pistols, and anti-grav sleds), or mere survival against the multifarious dangers of the future (such as gun-toting mutant rabbits, rampaging ancient death machines, or other Gamma Worlders bent on mayhem).

A recurrent source of conflict on Gamma World is the rivalry among the "Cryptic Alliances", semi-secret societies whose ideological agendas—usually verging on monomania—often bring them into conflict with the rest of the Gamma World.  For example, the Pure Strain Human "Knights of Genetic Purity" seek to exterminate all mutants, while the all-mutant "Iron Society" wants to eliminate unmutated humans.  Other rivalries involve attitudes towards Ancient technology, with some Alliances (such as "The Restorationists") seeking to rebuild Ancient society, while others (such as "The Seekers") want to destroy remaining artifacts.

System
Throughout the game's many editions, Gamma World has almost always remained strongly compatible with the then-current edition of Dungeons & Dragons (D&D). Attribute generation is much the same for instance with a range of 3 to 18, randomly generated by rolling three six-sided dice. The attributes themselves are the same, but with occasional name changes such as Physical Strength instead of Strength and Mental Strength instead of Wisdom. This allows Gamma World and D&D characters to potentially cross over genres.

Character generation is mostly random, and features one of the game's most distinctive mechanics, the mutation tables.  Players who choose to play mutants roll dice to randomly determine their characters' mutations.  All versions of Gamma World eschew a realistic portrayal of genetic mutation to one degree or another, instead giving characters fantastic abilities like psychic powers, laser beams, force fields, life draining and others. Other mutations are extensions or extremes of naturally existing features transposed from different species, such as electrical generation, infravision, quills, extra limbs, dual brains, carapaces, gills, etc.  These were offset with defects that also ranged from the fantastical—such as skin that dissolves in water, or a scent that attracts monsters—to the mundane, such as seizures, madness and phobias.

Characters in most versions of Gamma World earn experience points during their adventures, which cause the character's Rank (in some editions, Level) to increase.  Unlike D&D, however, the first two editions of Gamma World do not use a concept of true level or character class, and increases in Rank do not affect the character's skills or combat abilities.  In fact, in the first three editions of the game, character rank is primarily a measure of the character's social prestige.

The game mechanics used for resolving character actions, on the other hand, greatly varied between Gamma World editions. The first two editions, like the early editions of D&D, depend heavily on matrix-based mechanics, where two factors (one representing the actor or attacker, and one representing the opponent) are cross-referenced on a chart.  For some actions, such as attacks, the number located on the matrix represents a number the acting player must roll.  For other actions (such as determining the result of radiation exposure), the matrix result indicates a non-negotiable result.  Gamma World's first two editions had a variety of specialized matrices for different situations (again, closely resembling D&D).

The third edition rules replace specialized matrices with the Action Control Table (ACT), a single, color-coded chart that allowed players to determine whether a character action succeeded, and the degree of success, with a single roll.  (The ACT concept is drawn from the Marvel Super Heroes game published by TSR shortly before development of Gamma World's third edition.)  The ACT requires the referee to cross-reference the difficulty of a character action with the ability score used to complete that action, determining which column of the ACT is used for that action.  The character's player then rolls percentile dice; the result is compared to appropriate column, determining a degree of success or failure and eliminating the need for second result roll (e.g. the damage roll that many games require after a successful combat action).

The fourth edition was directly compatible with 2nd Edition AD&D with some minor differences in mechanics. The fifth and sixth editions though would relegate Gamma World to that of a Campaign Setting and require the core books to play. 5th uses the Alternity system which is mostly represented in the book but required the core rules in order to resolve some factors. 6th Edition though was fully incomplete on its own and required the d20 Modern rulebook in order to play the game.

The seventh version uses a streamlined version of D&D 4th edition mechanics. Character generation choice though was nearly fully removed. Instead of choosing a character class, a player had to roll a twenty-sided die two times and consult an accompanying character origin table. For example, a player might obtain the result "Radioactive Yeti" and gain the powers associated with the "Radioactive" and "Yeti" origins. Attributes, mutations, and skills were also randomly assigned. Two decks of cards comprising the core of a Collectible Card Game are included with the game. One deck represented random Alpha Mutations, which could be drawn to gain temporary powers, and the other contained various Omega Tech, powerful technological devices that could possibly backfire on those that used them. Some 4th edition rules enhancements for the setting include new damage types such as "Radiation", Gamma World-specific skills, and increased lethality. Despite these differences, it is possible to use characters and monsters from a D&D game in Gamma World and vice versa.

History

First Edition (1978)
The original Gamma World boxed set (containing a 56-page rulebook, a map of a devastated North America, and dice) was released in 1978.  TSR went on to publish three accessories for the 1st edition of the game:

GW1, Legion of Gold by Gary Gygax, Luke Gygax, and Paul Reiche III
GW2, Famine in Far-Go by Michael Price
Gamma World Referee's Screen

Grenadier Miniatures also supported the game, with a line of licensed miniatures.

At least one other TSR product was announced -- Metamorphosis Alpha to Omega, an adaptation of Metamorphosis Alpha's campaign setting to Gamma World's rules (Anon 1981). Work on the adaptation was halted when a 2nd edition of Gamma World was announced. This was later released as Metamorphosis Alpha to Omega using the Amazing Engine Rules.

Second Edition (1983)
The second edition Gamma World boxed set (with rules designed by Ward, Jaquet, and David James Ritchie) was released in 1983. Two modules and two accessories were released for this version:

GW3, The Cleansing War of Garik Blackhand by Michael Price & Garry Spiegle
GW4, The Mind Masters by Philip Taterczynski
GWAC1, Gamma World Referee's Screen and Mini-Module
GWAC2, Gamma World Character Sheets

TSR also produced four packs of Gamma World miniatures. TSR started production on a third adventure module, which was to be assigned the identification code GW5 and had the working title Rapture of the Deep. This module was not published.  However, a 'ghost' Second Edition GW5 Rapture of the Deep module was produced in 2007.

Third Edition (1986)
The 3rd edition of Gamma World was another boxed set, credited to James M. Ward. It introduced the Action Control Table, a color-coded table used to resolve nearly all actions in the game. (Color-coded tables were something of a trend at TSR in the mid-1980s. After 1984's Marvel Super Heroes proved the viability of the concept, TSR revised Gamma World, Star Frontiers, and Top Secret to use similar tables.) Unfortunately for TSR, this version of the rules became notorious for the number of editorial mistakes, including cross-references to rules that didn't appear in the boxed set. The errors were serious enough that TSR published a Gamma World Rules Supplement containing the "missing" rules. The Rules Supplement was sent to gamers who requested it by mail, and included in reprintings of the boxed set.

The five modules TSR published for Gamma World's 3rd edition introduced the setting's first multi-module metaplot, which involved rebuilding an ancient 'sky chariot':

GW6, Alpha Factor by Kim Eastland
GW7, Beta Principle by Bruce Nesmith
GW8, Gamma Base by Kim Eastland
GW9, Delta Fragment by Kim Eastland
GW10, Epsilon Cyborgs by Kim Eastland

TSR dropped the 3rd edition of Gamma World from its product line before the multi-module storyline could be completed. In 2003 an unofficial conclusion to the series was published under the title GW11 Omega Project.

Despite its editorial issues, the 3rd edition rules were well-received enough to win the 1986/1987 Gamer's Choice Award for "Best Science-Fiction Roleplaying Game".

Fourth Edition (1992)
The 4th edition of Gamma World was a 192-page softcover book, written by Bruce Nesmith and James M. Ward, published in May 1992 by TSR.  This version of the game abandoned the 3rd edition's Action Control Table for mechanics resembling 2nd Edition Advanced Dungeons & Dragons.  TSR published five accessories for the 4th edition:

GWA1, Treasures of the Ancients by Dale "Slade" Henson
GWA2, The Overlord of Bonparr by Jack A. Barker
GWQ1, Mutant Master by Bruce Nesmith
GWQ2, All Animals Are Equal by Dale "Slade" Henson
GWQ3, Home Before the Sky Falls by  Tim Beach, Paul Riegel, Drew Bittner, and Kim Eastland

TSR's Gamma World development team announced at Gen Con 1993 that no further products would be released for the 4th edition.  They also announced that TSR had restarted development of Metamorphosis Alpha to Omega, but that the manuscript would be completed using the Amazing Engine rules.

Fifth Edition (2000)
The 5th version of Gamma World was a supplement for the science-fiction game Alternity. (In a nod to Gamma World'''s reputation for being repeatedly revised, the book's back cover states "That's right, it's the return of the Gamma World".) The Gamma World Campaign Setting was a 192-page softcover book written by Andy Collins and Jeff Grubb, published in 2000 by Wizards of the Coast (WOTC), only a month after WOTC announced its cancellation of the Alternity line.  This version of Gamma World is unique as the only one not to have accessories or supplements.

Omega World (2002)
In September 2002, Omega World, a d20 System mini-game based on Gamma World and written by Jonathan Tweet, was published in  Dungeon 94/Polyhedron 153.  Tweet does not plan any expansions for the game, although it received a warm reception from Gamma World fans and players new to the concept alike.

Sixth Edition (2003)
In November 2002, Sword & Sorcery Studios (SSS) announced that it had licensed the Gamma World setting from WOTC in order to produce a sixth version of the game. SSS's version of the game, which reached the market in 2003, used the d20 Modern system, and mimicked D&D's "three core book" model with three hardcover manuals:Gamma World Player's Handbook by Bruce Baugh, Ian Eller, Mikko Rautalahti, and Geoff SkellamsGamma World Game Master's Guide by Bruce Baugh, Werner Hager, Lizard, and Doug OglesbyGamma World Machines and Mutants by David Bolack, Gareth Hanrahan, Patrick O'Duffy, and Chuck Wendig

Sword & Sorcery Studios also published three paperback supplements for the d20 version of Gamma World:Gamma World Beyond the Horizon by Ellen KileyGamma World Cryptic Alliances and Unknown Enemies by Owen K.C. Stephens, Alejandro Melchor, and Geoff SkellamsGamma World Out of the Vaults by James Maliszewski, John Snead, and Ellen P. Kiley

This new version of the game presented a more sober and serious approach to the concept of a post-nuclear world, at odds with the more light-hearted and adventurous approach taken by previous editions; it was also the first edition of the game to include fantastical nanotechnology on a large scale. In August 2005, White Wolf announced that it was reverting the rights to publish Gamma World products back to Wizards of the Coast, putting the game out of print again. Several critics and fans considered Tweet's Omega World to be a superior d20 System treatment of the Gamma World concept.

Seventh Edition (2010)
At the Dungeons & Dragons Experience fan convention in early 2010, Wizards of the Coast announced a new version titled D&D Gamma World, eventually released in October of that year. The game is compatible with the D&D 4th Edition rules and the System Reference Document, but is not considered a separate D&D setting.

The basic box included 80 non-random cards. In addition, random "boosters" of "Alpha Mutation" and "Omega Tech" cards for players are sold separately in packs of eight.

This edition of Gamma World includes the following three boxed sets (one core set and two expansion kits):D&D Gamma World Roleplaying Game by Richard Baker and Bruce R. CordellD&D Gamma World Expansion Kit: Famine in Far-go by Robert J. SchwalbD&D Gamma World Expansion Kit: Legion of Gold by Richard Baker and Bruce Cordell

Additional content was released for the 7th Edition of Gamma World at Game Day 2010 and at the 2010 Penny Arcade Expo, Trouble in Freesboro and Pax Extraterrestria respectively. In addition, a Christmas themed adventure and vehicular combat rules were released online.

Additionally, two novels were published in the setting. Sooner Dead by Mel Odom was published February 1st, 2011, and Red Sails in the Fallout by Paul Kidd, published July 5th, 2011. 

Reception
Don Turnbull reviewed Gamma World for White Dwarf #10, giving it an overall rating of 9 out of 10, and stated that "Gamma World is good quality - let there be no mistake. This has not been thrown together in haste by earnest amateurs over glasses of cheap booze. It is a thoroughly professional job which deserves a place on the shelf (and the playing table) of anyone remotely interested in the science fiction game-setting."

Ronald Pehr reviewed Gamma World in The Space Gamer No. 32. Pehr commented that "If you liked its progenitors, Gamma World is an interesting variant. Beginning players should find it easy to learn, and referees are challenged to create a playable, balanced world. It's somewhat expensive and the sudden-death power of futuristic weaponry and the lack of character 'levels' may put you off, but if the basic premise is appealing you'll probably enjoy Gamma World."

Chris Baylis reviewed Gamma World for Imagine magazine, and stated that "For a post nuclear holocaust role-playing game, Gamma World game has just about all the right ingredients, in the correct proportions. It is a very good introduction into the fantasy world of role-playing, and should seriously rival all other RPGs."

In the 1980 book The Complete Book of Wargames, game designer Jon Freeman commented, "This is in every sense an improved version of Metamorphosis Alpha. Rules have been tightened and elaborated, and the organization is clearly superior." Freeman concluded, "While it's not quite as open-ended in scope as Dungeons & Dragons, it has plenty of potential. It's hardly flawless, but Gamma World is one of the best things TSR has produced."

Cancelled Video Game
In 2011, a video game adaptation was announced at E3 called Gamma World: Alpha Mutation for the Xbox 360, PlayStation 3 and PC. It was to be developed by Bedlam Games and published by Atari. Unfortunately, due to unknown reasons, it was cancelled.

Legacy
The Swedish role playing game Mutant, released in 1984 by Äventyrsspel, was first pitched to its future writer as "Gamma World, set in Sweden".

The post-apocalyptic premise of the 1997 computer game Fallout was inspired by Gamma World. Game creator Tim Cain said it was not the most balanced RPG but it had a good spirit to it.

Gamma World was cited as a source of inspiration for the procedurally generated word-building in Caves of Qud.

Other reviews and commentaryWhite Wolf #36 (1993)
 Casus Belli #37 (April 1987)Fantastic Science Fiction v27 n10Asimov's Science Fiction v8 n8 (1984 08)Jeux & Stratégie #11Moves #41, p12, 15

See alsoAftermath!After The Bombd20 Apocalypsed20 FutureDarwin's WorldGammaraudersMetamorphosis AlphaThe Morrow ProjectMutant FutureRiftsRoad HogsTravellerTorgTwilight 2000WastelandReferences

Further reading
Anon 1981. 'RPGA Interview with... Jim Ward.' RPGA News, 3:6-12 (Winter 1981–82).
Anon 1982. 'RPGA Interview with... "Jake" Jaquet.' Polyhedron, 4:6-10 (1982).

Rabe, Jean  1987.  'Notes from HQ,' Polyhedron, 38:3,23 (1987).
Ward, James and Harold Johnson 1986. 'Gamma III.' Dragon, 117:76-80 (Jan 1986).
Williams, Skip 1989. 'Advice for All Mutants.' Dragon'', 149:28-30 (Sep 1989).

 
Alternity
D20 System
Post-apocalyptic role-playing games
Role-playing games introduced in 1978
Science fantasy role-playing games
TSR, Inc. games
Campaign settings